is a Japanese manga artist. He is also known by the name Joker Jun. In 1991 he replied to a recruitment ad for Toaplan. Along with some other staff Inoue was transferred to Gazelle before he left to join Cave, where he worked as character and graphic designer, sound producer, and a video game director. ESP Ra.De. was his first title as graphic director. He debuted as a manga artist in 2002, with his work . He is best known in the West for his manga Btooom!, which was serialized from 2009 to 2018.

Works

Games

Films 

 The Great Yokai War: Guardians (2021) – yōkai designer [with Katsuya Terada and Hiromitsu Soma]

Manga

Anime

References

External links
 

 
 Junya Inoue at VGMdb's encyclopedia
 Junya Inoue at Media Arts Database

Manga artists from Kōchi Prefecture
Living people
1971 births